Andrew Paul Sheahan  (born 30 September 1946) is a former Australian international cricketer who played 31 Test matches and three One Day Internationals as an opening and middle order batsman between 1967 and 1973.

He made his first-class debut in 1965 for the Victorian Sheffield Shield team against New South Wales scoring 62 and 5. An elegant stroke maker and fine cover fieldsman, his highest first-class score was 202 for Victoria against South Australia in 1966.

He made his Test debut the following year against the touring Indian side, scoring 81 and 35 in Adelaide batting at number three. His first Test century was a chanceless 114 against India in Kanpur in 1969 as a middle order batsmen. He toured England twice (1968 and 1972) and India and South Africa in 1969–70.

His form faltered after returning from the South African tour and he was dropped from the Australian team after the 2nd Test against the touring English side in 1970–71. However it was as an opening batsman that marked his return as an established Test cricketer, and he scored 127 against Pakistan in the Melbourne Test of 1972–73. Seemingly on the verge of becoming Australia's regular Test opening batsman, he retired from Test cricket at 26 to concentrate on his teaching career. He played one further season of interstate cricket, scoring 783 runs at 52.20 to help Victoria to victory in the Sheffield Shield in 1973–74.

He is a cousin of football journalist Mike Sheahan.

Education
Sheahan was educated at The Geelong College and the University of Melbourne, where he resided at Ormond College, and obtained a Bachelor of Science and Diploma of Education.

Career
Sheahan was Headmaster of Melbourne Grammar School from 1995 to 2009, having been principal of his old school Geelong College from 1986 to 1995, Second Master of St Peter's College, Adelaide from 1984 to 1985, and Housemaster of Manifold House, Geelong Grammar School from 1979 to 1983. Before working in Geelong, he taught at Winchester College in England.

He held the post of Vice President of the Melbourne Cricket Club from 2003 until he was elected president on 17 February 2011.

Honours
In the January 2014, Australia Day Honours List Sheahan was made a Member of the Order of Australia (AM) "For significant service to secondary education as a teacher, and through roles with sporting, charitable and community organisations."

He is a Fellow of the Australian Institute of Management.

In 1983, Sheahan suggested that the annual World Series Cup limited overs series may be fixed, stating that, "Mr Packer [the owner of the television station which broadcast the matches] has a fair hand in — or Mr Packer's organisation has a fair hand in —saying who actually plays off in the final.”

References

1946 births
Living people
Australia One Day International cricketers
Australia Test cricketers
Australian people of English descent
Victoria cricketers
Melbourne Cricket Club cricketers
University of Melbourne alumni
People educated at Geelong College
Australian cricketers
Members of the Order of Australia
Cricketers from Melbourne
Australian headmasters
People from Werribee, Victoria
Geelong College
Melbourne Grammar School